Carman is an unincorporated village in Carman Township, Henderson County, Illinois, United States.

Carman lies on along the Mississippi River across from Burlington, Iowa. Due to its proximity to the river, parts of Carman frequently flood.

Demographics

References

 

Unincorporated communities in Illinois
Unincorporated communities in Henderson County, Illinois